Chiang Ming-hsiung (born 15 January 1967) is a Taiwanese weightlifter. He competed in the men's flyweight event at the 1988 Summer Olympics.

References

1967 births
Living people
Taiwanese male weightlifters
Olympic weightlifters of Taiwan
Weightlifters at the 1988 Summer Olympics
Place of birth missing (living people)